The Hakone Open-Air Museum (箱根 彫刻の森美術館, Hakone Choukoku no Mori Bijutsukan) is Japan's first open-air museum, opened in 1969 in Hakone in Ashigarashimo District, Kanagawa Prefecture, Japan. It has collections of artworks made by Picasso, Henry Moore, Taro Okamoto, Yasuo Mizui, Churyo Sato, Susumu Shingū, and many others, featuring over a thousand sculptures and works of art. The museum is affiliated with the Fujisankei Communications Group media conglomerate.

The museum houses over 1,000 sculptures and features art by Constantin Brâncuși, Barbara Hepworth, Rokuzan Ogiwara, and Kōtarō Takamura. About 120 sculptural works are on permanent display across the large sculpture park.

The museum is split into five indoor exhibitions and is best known for the Picasso Pavilion hall, which features around 300 of Picasso's works. The museum also offers sculptures that children can play on and a naturally-fed hot-spring foot bath for guests.

Gallery

Sculpture Park & Gardens

References

External links
 Official Website

Art museums and galleries in Japan
Open-air museums in Japan
Museums in Kanagawa Prefecture
Sculpture galleries
Japanese sculpture
Buildings and structures in Hakone, Kanagawa
Sculpture gardens, trails and parks in Asia
Fujisankei Communications Group
1969 establishments in Japan